The 2013 National Camogie League, known for sponsorship reasons as the Irish Daily Star National Camogie League, commenced in February 2013 and was won by Cork.

References

League
National Camogie League seasons